The Open Air Theatre in Washington Crossing State Park in the City of Titusville, NJ, is a permanent venue with a five-month summer season. The venue is currently closed.

External links

Buildings and structures in Mercer County, New Jersey
Theatres in New Jersey
Tourist attractions in Mercer County, New Jersey